A gutter punk is a homeless or transient individual who displays a variety of specific lifestyle traits and characteristics that often, but not always, are associated with the punk subculture. Attributes may include unkempt dreadlocks, nose rings, Mohawk hairstyles, and tattooed faces. Gutter punks are sometimes referred to as "crusties", "crusty punks", "crust punks", or “crusty kids”; "traveling" or "traveler kids"; "traveling" or "traveler punks", or simply "travelers"; and "punk hobos" or "hobo-punks", among other terms. Some self-identified gutter punks may distinguish themselves from "crusties" or "crust punks" and "travellers", and vice versa; however, there is considerable overlap between the groups, and the terms are often used interchangeably.

Nomenclature
In addition to the term "gutter punk", members of the gutter punk subculture may also be described as "crusties", "crusty punks", "crust kids", “crusty kids”, or "crust punks". 

Other terms used to describe gutter punks include "travelers", “anarcho-punks” (however, this term may also be used to describe any punk in general who identifies with anarchism, not just gutter punks, while some gutter punks may in fact not be ideologically or politically subscribed to anarchist philosophy); "traveling punks" or "traveler punks"; "traveling kids", "traveler kids", or "travel kids"; "punk hobos", "hobo-punks" / "hobo punks", or simply "modern-day hobos"; "transient punks", "punk nomads", "road kids", "gutter pirates", "street punks," "dirty kids", "train hoppers" or "railriders" (in reference to the common gutter punk practice of freighthopping); “punk à chiens” (in Francophone regions); “punkabbestia” (in Italy); and "oogles". Certain terms used to describe the subculture may not be used by gutter punks themselves, or may in fact refer to related or similar but somewhat different subcultures. "Oogle", while sometimes used to describe gutter punks in general, is often used by gutter punks themselves to describe members of the subculture whom they perceive as "poseurs" or inauthentic.

"Scumfuck" or "Scum fuck" may be used, especially among gutter punks, to refer to certain members of the gutter punk subculture who are perceived as selfish, apathetic, violent, aggressive, overly nihilistic, or overly hedonistic. Scumfucks are often labeled as heavy alcohol and drug users with overtly macho tendencies, and they are generally more apolitical than other members of the gutter punk subculture. The notorious punk musician GG Allin was known to use the term to describe himself.

Travel and tagging
Gutter punks are generally homeless and transient. Many travel by alternative means of transportation such as illegally riding freight trains ("freighthopping") or hitchhiking. The number of gutter punks who travel to various U.S. cities is in the thousands, and they often congregate in major U.S. cities. Some may squat in abandoned buildings. 
They often use  tagging to identify each other's movements or declare that they were in a specific location at some time. A person's tag may be an individual "signature", or affiliation with a particular group or ideology. Examples are found on freight trains, under bridges, in the neighborhoods they frequent, etc. Tagging is also helpful to direct other gutter punks to places to sleep, find food, obtain drugs, etc. Other times it may be for the thrill of vandalism in general, although that sort of graffiti wouldn't necessarily be called "tagging" and are more akin to vulgarity, crude drawings, and street art. Tagging is also to display symbols that may shock or offend members of the general public, such as  anarchy symbols,  Satanic symbols (although most are not actually Satanists), ACAB (All Cops Are Bastards), etc.

Lifestyle
Gutter punks are sometimes voluntarily unemployed and may acquire income by panhandling, sometimes holding signs (known as "flying a sign") requesting spare change (known as “spange,” with the act called “spanging.”) Some gutter punks are drug dealers or refer "custies" ('customers') in exchange for "finder's fee". Some earn a meager but honest income as "buskers", playing acoustic instruments such as the guitar, banjo, and mandolin on the sidewalk for tips. Other gutter punks earn income as temporary or migrant workers.

Cities of congregation
Cities where gutter punks may congregate in Canada and the United States include Halifax, Nova Scotia; Ann Arbor, Michigan; Winnipeg, Manitoba; Denver, Colorado; Asheville, North Carolina; Richmond, Virginia; Berkeley, California; the Haight-Ashbury district in San Francisco, and the Ocean Beach area of San Diego; Seattle, Washington; Portland, Oregon; Surbiton, Greater London; New Orleans, Louisiana; Austin, Texas; Lubbock, Texas; Madison, Wisconsin; Boston, Massachusetts; Philadelphia, Pennsylvania, Pittsburgh, Pennsylvania; Chicago, Illinois; and the East Village, Manhattan and Williamsburg, Brooklyn in New York City.

See also 

 Anarcho-punk
 Bohemianism
 Crusties
 Crust punk
 Folk punk
 Feral (subculture)
 Hobo
 List of subcultures
 New Age travellers
 Punk ideologies
 Punk subculture
 Squatting
 Refusal of work
 The Decline of Western Civilization III – film about young homeless punks of Los Angeles in the late 1990s

References

Further reading
 
Tearing Down the Streets: Adventures in Urban Anarchy. pp. 46–47.
"Young Anger Is Gathering On The Streets – Gutter Punks Reject Mainstream In U.S. As Inane, Hypocritical". The Seattle Times (originally published in Washington Post).
 

Refusal of work
Punk
Itinerant living
Youth culture